Bagnomaria is a 1999 Italian comedy film directed by Giorgio Panariello.

Cast
Giorgio Panariello as Mario, PR, Merigo and Simone
Gianna Giachetti as Bice
Manuela Arcuri as Mara
Andrea Cambi as Rodolfo
Ugo Pagliai as mayor Valdemaro
Katia Beni as Ines, the mayor's wife
Pietro Fornaciari as Livorno
Lillo Petrolo as Man in black
Claudio Gregori as Man in black
Dario Cassini as Alex
Isabella Orsini as Cristina
Alberto Caiazza as Space
Gina Rovere as the nun
Renzo Rinaldi as Don Paolo
Mario Cipollini as himself
Tony Corallo as himself

References

External links

1999 films
1990s Italian-language films
1999 comedy films
Italian comedy films
Films set in Tuscany
Films shot in Tuscany
1990s Italian films